Richard Douglas is the name of:

 Dick Douglas (1932–2014), Scottish politician
 Richard Douglas (civil servant) (born 1956), United Kingdom civil servant
 Richard Douglas (footballer) (born 1987), Australian rules footballer
 Richard Douglas (letter writer) (floruit 1560-1600), Scottish courtier